Cornelian Dende OFM (Scranton, Pennsylvania, 1915-31 August 1996) also known as "Father Justin," was a Polish-American Franciscan priest, director of "The Rosary Hour," a Polish-language weekly radio program from Buffalo, New York.

He was born in Scranton, Pennsylvania and did his collegiate studies in Montreal, Poland and Rome.

References

1915 births
1996 deaths
American expatriates in Canada
American expatriates in Poland
American expatriates in Italy
20th-century American Roman Catholic priests
American people of Polish descent
American radio directors
People from Buffalo, New York